New Hampshire Route 113 (abbreviated NH 113) is a  east–west state highway in east-central New Hampshire.  NH 113 begins in the Lakes Region at an intersection with U.S. Route 3 and New Hampshire Route 25 in Holderness, and stretches eastward across the central part of the state, ending at an intersection with U.S. Route 302 in Conway, just a few miles west of the Maine border.

Route description
NH 113 is signed as an east-west route, but is oriented in a southwest-northeast fashion. It begins in Holderness, splitting off the Daniel Webster Highway (US 3/NH 25) near Squam Lake. While the D.W. Highway skirts the southern side of the lake, NH 113 heads around the west and north sides of the lake and east into the town of Sandwich, where it meets the northern end of NH 109. Continuing northeast, NH 113A splits off to the north before NH 113 turns east to enter Tamworth, where it joins NH 25 for a short concurrency. NH 113 turns back northeast, intersecting the eastern end of the NH 113A loop before crossing the White Mountain Highway (NH 16) near Chocorua Lake. NH 113 continues eastward into Madison, meeting the northern end of NH 41, and then turns almost due north towards Conway. Shortly after entering Albany, NH 113 once again intersects NH 16, this time forming a concurrency. After a short trip through the extreme corner of Albany, the conjoined routes enter Conway. Along the way the two routes meet the eastern end of the Kancamagus Highway (NH 112). In downtown Conway, NH 113 splits eastward from NH 16 just after intersecting the northern end of NH 153. While NH 16 continues northward towards North Conway, NH 113 heads east towards Center Conway as East Main Street. East Main Street continues as US 302 towards the Maine state border.

History
The historic eastern terminus of NH 113 as signed was at the Maine state line, along current US 302. From Center Conway, NH 113 was cosigned with US 302 and abruptly ended at the state line.

By fall 2015, new signage indicated that NH 113 had been truncated to end at US 302 at their junction in Center Conway.  Between this intersection and the Maine state line, East Main Street is signed solely as US 302.

Maine State Route 113 is unrelated to NH 113, though the former does cross into New Hampshire and runs briefly within East Conway.  At their closest, the routes lie within  of each other.

Major intersections

Suffixed routes

New Hampshire Route 113A

New Hampshire Route 113A is a  loop road in Carroll County, New Hampshire. The highway splits from NH 113 in Tamworth, loops around to the north, west and south, then rejoins NH 113 again in the town of Sandwich. The road provides access to Hemenway State Forest in the White Mountains area of New Hampshire.

The eastern terminus of NH 113A is in Tamworth at NH 113. In this area, the highway is named Chinook Trail. The western terminus is at NH 113 in Sandwich, where the road is named Whiteface Road.

Along the route NH 113A passes through the village of Wonalancet in Tamworth and Whiteface and North Sandwich in Sandwich.

New Hampshire Route 113B

New Hampshire Route 113B (NH 113B), despite its designation, is not a loop road of NH 113. The route, which never intersects nor comes close to NH 113, is a loop of Maine State Route 113, but lies almost entirely within New Hampshire, producing the very unusual situation of one state having a suffixed route off another state's highway.

Both ends of the highway are located in the town of Stow, Maine, while most of the route runs in Chatham, New Hampshire.  It retains the NH 113B designation in both states. 

NH 113B is one of two New Hampshire routes (the other being NH 153) which cross into Maine but retain their designations.   North of NH 113B's northern terminus, SR 113 immediately crosses into New Hampshire for a couple of miles while retaining its own designation.

See also
Maine State Route 113, which crosses into New Hampshire twice.

References

External links

New Hampshire State Route 113 on Flickr
New Hampshire State Route 113B on Flickr

113
Transportation in Grafton County, New Hampshire
Transportation in Carroll County, New Hampshire